Album was a monthly art photography magazine from Album Photographic Ltd. that published 12 issues between February 1970 and January 1971.

Although it was a short-lived publication, Album is important in that it featured budding photographers who have since become notable, including several members of Magnum Photos. Featured photographers include Bill Brandt, W. Eugene Smith and Emmet Gowin.

History and profile
Album was founded and edited by Bill Jay (previously editor of Creative Camera); the publisher was Aidan Ellis (also previously with Creative Camera, as artist and publisher); and Tristram Powell, a television and film director, was in charge of finance.

Album remains unique in publishing a combination of contemporary and historical photographers, along with essays and some poetry and drawings.

Issues

Issue 1, February 1970 
The February 1970 issue of Album featured the following photographers:

 Benjamin Stone
 Bill Brandt (also, front cover)
 Roger Mertin
 Sylvester Jacobs

Issue 2, March 1970 

The March 1970 issue of Album featured the following photographers:

 P. H. Emerson
 W. Eugene Smith (also, front cover)
 David Hurn
 Paddy Summerfield

Issue 3, April 1970 

The April 1970 issue of Album featured the following photographers:

 Eugène Atget
 Tony Ray-Jones (also, front cover)
 Thurston Hopkins
 Roger Mertin

Issue 4, May 1970 

The May 1970 issue of Album featured the following photographers:

 Lewis Hine
 Les Krims
 Cas Oorthuys (also, front cover)
 Thomas Barrow

Issue 5, June 1970 

The June 1970 issue of Album featured the following photographers:

 Andrew Lanyon
 
 Imogen Cunningham (also, front cover)
 Emmet Gowin

Issue 6, July 1970 

The July 1970 issue of Album featured selections from the 50,000 prints in the George Eastman House Collections

Issue 7, August 1970 

The August 1970 issue of Album featured the following photographers:

 Eugène Atget (photographed by Berenice Abbott, front cover)
 Paul Martin
 Berenice Abbott
 Duane Michals
 David Hockney

Issue 8, September 1970 

The September 1970 issue of Album featured the following photographers:

 Roger Mertin
 Brassaï
 Edward Weston
 George Rodger (also, front cover)

Issue 9, October 1970 

The ninth issue of Album featured the following photographers:
 John Claridge (also, front cover)
 Manuel Álvarez Bravo
 Satyajit Ray
 Charles Harbutt
 John Thomson
 Sir William J Newton

Issue 10, October 1970 

The tenth issue of Album featured the following photographers:

 Naomi Savage
 Anne Noggle
 Patrick Ward (also, front cover)

Issue 11, December 1970 

The December 1970 issue of Album featured the following:
 The Royal Photographic Society permanent collection
 Gordon Bennett
 Don McCullin
 Braquehais
 Allen A. Dutton

Issue 12, January 1971 

The final issue of Album featured the following photographers:
 Édouard Boubat
 Elliott Erwitt (also, front cover)
 Gianni Berengo Gardin

Notes

References

External links 
 Magazine Memoirs: Creative Camera and Album, 1968-1972, by Bill Jay

1970 establishments in the United Kingdom
1971 disestablishments in the United Kingdom
Visual arts magazines published in the United Kingdom
Monthly magazines published in the United Kingdom
Defunct magazines published in the United Kingdom
Magazines established in 1970
Magazines disestablished in 1971
Photography magazines
Photography in the United Kingdom